The Adventures of Electronic (translit. Priklyucheniya Elektronika) is a 1979 Soviet children's science fiction TV miniseries, directed by Konstantin Bromberg.

The series' screenplay was adapted by Yevgeny Veltistov from his own two children's novels, Electronic – the boy from the suitcase (1964) and Ressy – an elusive friend (1971). The TV premiere was on 2 May 1980. The film achieved a cult status among the Soviet kids.

Plot summary 
A robot named Electronic escapes from Professor Gromov's laboratory. The robot looks exactly like Sergey (Serezha) Syroezhkin, a boy from a magazine cover, who was chosen by Gromov as a model to construct Elektronic.

By coincidence, the double meets its prototype. 6-grader Serezha cunningly suggests that Elektronik should impersonate him – go to school instead of him and even live in his home.  His plan works, as no one can tell the difference between them.  Serezha's teachers delight in a very gifted pupil, who suddenly shows unbelievable talents in math, gymnastics, drawing and even singing. Sergey's parents do not suspect his trick and are glad of their pseudo-son's progress.

However, eventually the boy realizes that as the robot takes over "his" life, he may be out of business...

At the same time somewhere abroad, a gang of criminals operates. It is headed by a criminal authority known as Stump. He tells Urrie, the gang's most skillful member to find and kidnap Electronic. They want to organize the "crime of the century" with the use of his extraordinary abilities.

Cast 
 Yury Torsuyev as Sergey Syroyezhkin (dubbed by Irina Grishina, vocal by Elena Kamburova)
 Vladimir Torsuyev as Elektronic (dubbed by Nadezhda Pod'yapol'skaya, vocal by Elena Shuyenkova)
 Vasily Skromny as Makar Gusev
 Oksana Alekseyeva as Maria Svetlova
 Maksim Kalinin as Maksim Korol'kov
 Dmitri Maksimov as Viktor Smirnov
 Evgeny Livshits as Chizhikov (often mistakenly called Ryzhikov)
 Valeriya Soluyan as Zoya Kukushkina
 Oksana Fandera as an unnamed schoolgirl who gets Chizhikov's name wrong.
 Vladimir Basov as Stump
 Nikolai Karachentsov as Urrie
 Nikolai Grinko as Prof. Viktor Ivanovich Gromov
 Yelizaveta Nikishchikhina as Masha, Gromov's assistant
 Yevgeny Vesnik as Taratar, the math teacher
 Maya Bulgakova as School's headmistress
 Nikolay Boyarsky as Rostik, the gymnastics teacher
 Roza Makagonova as singing lessons teacher
 Nataliya Vasazhenko as Sergey's mother
 Yuri Chernov as Sergey's father
 Lev Perfilov as Lyug, Stump's gangster
 Gennadi Yalovich as Bree, Stump's gangster

Production
Originally, it was planned that both Syroyezhkin and Elektronic roles would be played by just one boy. But the director of the film decided to simplify the filming process by using twins.  His assistants screened a hundred twins throughout most of the Soviet Union. One of the casting days took place in the winter, when the temperature was below zero, nobody came except for the Torsuyev brothers. It was they who were cast in leading roles. In test filmings, Yuri played the role of Elektronic and Vladimir of Syroyezhkin, but the roles were later changed by the director. During the filming period the kids grew up too fast, and it was necessary to make new costumes from time to time.

Music
Music for the film were written by Yevgeni Krylatov. The songs were performed in the film by Yelena Kamburova, Yelena Shuenkova and the chorus; no actors, except for Karachentsov and Basov, were afforded an opportunity to sing (The lyrics were written by Yuri Entin).

References

External links

1980 films
1980 in the Soviet Union
Soviet science fiction adventure films
1980s Russian-language films
Android (robot) films
Soviet musical films
1980s science fiction adventure films
Soviet television miniseries
Odesa Film Studio films
1980s musical films
1970s Soviet television series
1970s television miniseries